NSX may refer to:

Stock exchanges
 Namibian Stock Exchange (NSX)
 National Stock Exchange (Jersey City, New Jersey), US (NSX)
 National Stock Exchange of Australia (NSX)

Other uses
 Neon Swing X-perience (NSX), a US musical group
 Honda NSX (New Sportscar eXperimental/eXperience), an automobile distributed as Acura NSX in North America
 Post Office Sorting Van (NSX), a British rail vehicle
 VMware NSX, a network virtualization product
 Narrow Shape Cross-Section Blade (NSX), an ice-skating blade designed by Diederik Hol